A Buyer Listing Service ("BLS") is a system designed to gather relevant information, via data entries by a prospective home buyer, her real estate 'Buyer Agent', or both, concerning the Buyer's financial qualifications regarding a home purchase and the Buyer's needs and wants for  the sought for home (number of bedrooms, location, square footage, etc).  Working in much the same way as the well-known Multiple Listing Service ("MLS") operates to market homes-for-sale, a BLS system provides corresponding data from the Buyer's perspective.  BLS systems may be integrated with MLS systems operated by the local Association of Realtors, 'free-standing' and available directly to Buyer and Seller consumers, or operated through in-house systems of privately owned real estate brokerages.

Residential real estate